The House by the Sea (German: Das Haus am Meer) is a 1924 German silent film directed by  and starring Asta Nielsen, Gregori Chmara and Albert Steinrück. The film is adapted from the play by Stefan Zweig.

The art direction was by Kurt Richter.

Plot
Fisherman Enrico lives happily with Teresa when a band of soldiers appear and accuse her of prostitution. As Enrico's brother is tricked into the Army, Enrico takes his place. Teresa's love for him conquers all.

Cast
 Asta Nielsen as Teresa, Enrico's wife 
 Gregori Chmara as Enrico, Fisherman 
 Albert Steinrück as Werber  
 Carl Auen as Gino  
 Alexandra Sorina as his wife
 Hermann Vallentin as Sergeant  
 Rudolf Del Zopp as Ohm

References

Bibliography
 Grange, William. Cultural Chronicle of the Weimar Republic. Scarecrow Press, 2008.

External links

1924 films
Films of the Weimar Republic
German silent feature films
Films directed by Fritz Kaufmann
Films based on works by Stefan Zweig
German films based on plays
German black-and-white films
Nero-Film films